Rear Admiral M Hasan Ali Khan, ndc, psc, BN (died February 19, 2013) was Chief of Staff of the Bangladesh Navy between 2005 and 2007. He was preceded by Rear Admiral Shah Iqbal Mujtaba ndc, psc, BN and succeeded by Vice Admiral Sarwar Jahan Nizam ndu, psc, BN.

Early life

Khan was born in the hat-laxmipur district of Gaibandha in 1950. He joined as an officer cadet in Pakistan Navy on 9 May 1969. Later he was commissioned into the Executive Branch of Bangladesh Navy in 1972. Admiral Khan graduated from the Defence Services Command & Staff College in Dhaka and National Defence College Dhaka. He also took the degree from United States Pacific Centre for Security Studies Executives course.

Naval commands

Khan commanded a number of ships and establishments of the navy. Khan also held a range of staff command positions including Administrative Authority Dhaka (ADMIN Dhaka) and Assistant Chief of the Naval Staff (Logistics) at Naval Headquarters. Rear Admiral M Hasan Ali Khan, ndc, psc, BN took over the charge of Chief of Naval Staff on 10 January 2005, and served in that position until retiring on February 10, 2007.

He died on 19 February 2013 and was buried at Banani military graveyard.

References 

|-

Chiefs of Naval Staff (Bangladesh)
Bangladeshi Navy admirals
Burials at Banani Graveyard
2013 deaths